

Events

January

 January 15 – The Moon moves into its nearest point to Earth, called perigee, at the same time as its fullest phase of the Lunar Cycle.
 January 26 – The Indian National Congress declares this date as Independence Day, or as the day for Poorna Swaraj (Complete Independence).
 January 28 – The first patent for a field-effect transistor is granted in the United States, to Julius Edgar Lilienfeld.
 January 30 – Pavel Molchanov launches a radiosonde from Slutsk in the Soviet Union.

February

 February 10 – The Việt Nam Quốc Dân Đảng launch the Yên Bái mutiny in the hope of ending French colonial rule in Vietnam.
 February 18 – While studying photographs taken in January, Clyde Tombaugh confirms the existence of Pluto, a celestial body considered a planet until redefined as a dwarf planet in 2006.

March

 March 2 
 Mahatma Gandhi informs the British Viceroy of India that civil disobedience will begin the following week.
 André Tardieu begins his second term as Prime Minister of France.
 March 6
 International Unemployment Day is observed in countries throughout the world.
 The first frozen foods of Clarence Birdseye go on sale in Springfield, Massachusetts.
 March 12 – Mahatma Gandhi sets off on a 200-mile protest march towards the sea with 78 followers, to protest against the British monopoly on salt; more will join them during the Salt March that ends on April 5.
 March 28 – The government of Turkey requests the international community to adopt Istanbul and Ankara, as the official names for Constantinople and Angora. The U.S. State Department adopts the "Istanbul" form in May.
 March 29 – Heinrich Brüning is appointed Chancellor of Germany.
 March 31 – The Motion Picture Production Code ("Hays Code") is instituted in the United States, imposing strict guidelines on the treatment of sex, crime, religion and violence in films for the next 40 years.

April

 April 6
 In an act of civil disobedience, Mahatma Gandhi breaks the salt laws of British India by making salt by the sea at the end of the Salt March.
 The International Left Opposition (ILO) is founded in Paris, France.
 April 17 – Neoprene is invented by DuPont.
 April 18 – The Chittagong Rebellion begins in India, with the Chittagong armoury raid.
 April 21
 A fire in the Ohio Penitentiary in Columbus, United States kills 320 people.
 The Turkestan–Siberia Railway is completed.
 April 22 – The United Kingdom, Japan and the United States sign the London Naval Treaty to regulate submarine warfare and limit naval shipbuilding.

May

 May 6 – The 7.1  Salmas earthquake shakes northwestern Iran and southeastern Turkey, with a maximum Mercalli intensity of IX (Violent); up to 3,000 people are killed.
 May 10 – The National Pan-Hellenic Council is founded in Washington, D.C.
 May 15 – Nurse Ellen Church becomes the world's first flight attendant, working on a Boeing Air Transport trimotor.
 May 16 – Rafael Leónidas Trujillo is elected president of the Dominican Republic.
 May 17 – French Prime Minister André Tardieu decides to withdraw the remaining French troops from the Rhineland (they depart by June 30).
 May 24 – Amy Johnson lands in Darwin, Australia, becoming the first woman to fly solo from England to Australia (she left on May 5 for the 11,000 mile flight).

June

 June 7 – Carl Gustaf Ekman becomes Prime Minister of Sweden, for the second and final time.
 June 14 – The Bureau of Narcotics is established under the United States Department of the Treasury, replacing the Narcotics Division of the Prohibition Unit.
 June 17 – President Herbert Hoover signs the Smoot–Hawley Tariff Act into law, implementing protectionist trade policies in the United States.

July

 July 4 – The dedication of George Washington's sculpted head is held at Mount Rushmore, South Dakota.
 July 5 – The Seventh Lambeth Conference of Anglican bishops opens. This conference approves the use of birth control in limited circumstances, a move away from the Christian views on contraception expressed by the Sixth Conference a decade earlier.
 July 7
 The Lapua Movement marches in Helsinki, Finland.
 Building of the Boulder Dam (later known as the Hoover Dam) is started on the Colorado River, in the United States.
 July 11 – Australian cricketer Donald Bradman scores a world record 309 runs in one day, on his way to the highest individual Test innings of 334, during a Test match against England.
 July 13 – The first FIFA World Cup starts: Lucien Laurent scores the first goal, for France against Mexico.
 July 19 – Georges Simenon's detective character Inspector Jules Maigret makes his first appearance in print under Simenon's own name, when the novel Pietr-le-Letton (known in English as The Strange Case of Peter the Lett) begins serialization in a French weekly magazine. Simenon will eventually write 75 novels (as well as 28 short stories) featuring the pipe-smoking Paris detective.
 July 28 – R. B. Bennett defeats William Lyon Mackenzie King in federal elections, and becomes the Prime Minister of Canada.
 July 29 – British airship R100 sets out for a successful 78-hour passage to Canada.
 July 30
 Uruguay beats Argentina 4–2, to win the first Association football FIFA World Cup final at Estadio Centenario, in Montevideo.
 New York station W2XBS is put in charge of NBC broadcast engineers.
 July 31 – The radio drama The Shadow airs for the first time in the United States.
 July – The First Eastern Women's Congress takes place in Damascus in Syria.

August

 August – The volcanic island of Anak Krakatau begins to form permanently in the Sunda Strait.
 August 7 – R. B. Bennett takes office as the eleventh Prime Minister of Canada.
 August 12 – Turkish troops move into Persia, to fight Kurdish insurgents.
 August 16 – The first British Empire Games open in Hamilton, Ontario, Canada.
 August 27 – A military junta takes over in Peru.

September

 September 3 – A huge hurricane in the Caribbean demolishes most of the city of Santo Domingo, in the Dominican Republic.
 September 6 – 1930 Argentine coup d'état: José Félix Uriburu carries out a military coup, overthrowing Hipólito Yrigoyen, President of Argentina.
 September 8 – Scotch Tape, invented by Richard Gurley Drew, is sold by the 3M company in the United States for the first time.
 September 14 – German federal election, 1930: National Socialists win 107 seats in the German Parliament, the Reichstag (18.3% of all the votes), making them the second largest party.
September 17 – The Kurdish Ararat rebellion is suppressed by the Turks.
 September 20 – The Eastern Catholic Rite Syro-Malankara Catholic Church is formed.
 September 27 – İsmet İnönü forms a new government in Turkey (6th government).

October

 October – The Indochinese Communist Party is formed.
 October 1 – British rule of Weihaiwei ends, as it is returned to China.
 October 3 – The German Socialist Labour Party in Poland – Left is founded, following a split in the DSAP in Łódź.
 October 5 – British airship R101 crashes in France en route to India, on its maiden long-range flight, resulting in the loss of 48 lives.
 October 14 – Ståhlberg kidnapping: The former and first President of Finland, K. J. Ståhlberg, and his wife, Ester Ståhlberg, are kidnapped from their home by members of the far-right Lapua Movement.
 October 20 – A British White Paper demands restrictions on Jewish immigration into Mandatory Palestine.
 October 24 – Brazilian Revolution of 1930: Getúlio Vargas overthrows Washington Luís.
 October 27 – Ratifications are exchanged in London on the first London Naval Treaty signed in April, modifying the Washington Naval Treaty of 1925. Its arms limitation provisions go into effect immediately, hence putting more limits on the expensive naval arms race between its five signatories (the United Kingdom, the United States, the Japanese Empire, France, and Italy.)

November

 November 2 – Haile Selassie is crowned emperor of Ethiopia.
 November 3 – Getúlio Vargas becomes president of Brazil.
 November 25
 An earthquake in the Izu Peninsula of Japan kills 223 people, and destroys 650 buildings.
 Cecil George Paine, a pathologist at the Sheffield Royal Infirmary in England, achieves the first recorded cure (of an eye infection) using penicillin.

December

 December – All adult Turkish women are given the right to vote in elections.
 December 19 – Mount Merapi volcano in central Java, Indonesia, erupts, destroying numerous villages and killing 1,300 people.
 December 24 – In London, inventor Harry Grindell Matthews demonstrates his device to project pictures on clouds.
 December 29 – Sir Muhammad Iqbal's presidential address in Allahabad introduces the two-nation theory, outlining a vision for the creation of Pakistan.
 December 31 – The Papal encyclical Casti connubii, issued by Pope Pius XI, stresses the sanctity of marriage, prohibits Roman Catholics from using any form of artificial birth control, and reaffirms the Catholic prohibition on abortion.

Date unknown
 Bernhard Schmidt invents the Schmidt camera.

Births

January

 January 1 
 Gaafar Nimeiry, 4th President of Sudan (d. 2009)
 Ty Hardin, American actor (d. 2017)
 Frederick Wiseman, American director and producer
 January 3
 Robert Loggia, American actor (d. 2015)
 Ahmed Osman, Prime Minister of Morocco
 January 5 – M. R. Srinivasan, Indian nuclear scientist
 January 6
 "Professor Tanaka" (Charles Kalani, Jr.), American wrestler and actor (d. 2000)
 Vic Tayback, American actor (d. 1990) 
 January 9 – Pavel Kolchin, Soviet Olympic cross-country skier (d. 2010)
 January 10 – Roy E. Disney, Disney executive (d. 2009) 
 January 11 – Rod Taylor, Australian actor (d. 2015)
 January 12
 Tim Horton, Canadian hockey player, co-founder of Tim Hortons fast food chain (d. 1974)
 Jennifer Johnston, Irish novelist
 Glenn Yarbrough, American singer (d. 2016)
 January 15 – Hédi Baccouche, Prime Minister of Tunisia (d. 2020)
 January 16 – Mary Ann McMorrow, American judge (d. 2013)
 January 19 – Tippi Hedren, American actress
 January 20 – Buzz Aldrin, American pilot, astronaut (Apollo 11), second person to set foot on the Moon
 January 21 – Mainza Chona, Zambian politician and diplomat (d. 2001) 
 January 23
 Derek Walcott, West Indian writer, Nobel Prize laureate (d. 2017)
 William R. Pogue, American astronaut (d. 2014)
 January 24 – Terence Bayler, New Zealand actor (d. 2016)
 January 27 – Bobby Bland, African-American R&B musician (d. 2013)
 January 30
 Gene Hackman, American actor and novelist
 Magnus Malan, South African soldier, Minister of Defence in the 1980s (d. 2011)

February

 February 1
 Shahabuddin Ahmed, 12th president of Bangladesh (d. 2022)
 Hussain Muhammad Ershad, 10th president of Bangladesh (d. 2019)
 February 2 – Ruth M. Kirk, American politician (d. 2011)
 February 3 – Mani Krishnaswami, Carnatic music vocalist from Tamil Nadu, India (d. 2002)
 February 4 – Jim Loscutoff, American basketball player (d. 2015)
 February 7 – Ikutaro Kakehashi, Japanese engineer and entrepreneur (d. 2017)
 February 8 – Alejandro Rey, Argentine-American actor (d. 1987)
 February 10 – Robert Wagner, American actor
 February 13 
 Ernst Fuchs, Austrian painter (d. 2015)
 Israel Kirzner, English-born American economist, author and academic 
 February 15 – Bruce Dawe, Australian poet (d. 2020)
 February 17 – Ruth Rendell, British author (d. 2015)
 February 19 
 John Frankenheimer, American film director (d. 2002)
 K. Viswanath, Indian actor, director and screenwriter (d. 2023)
 February 22 – Marni Nixon, American vocalist (d. 2016)
 February 23 – Goro Shimura, Japanese mathematician (d. 2019)
 February 27 – Joanne Woodward, American actress
 February 28 – Leon Cooper, American physicist, Nobel Prize laureate

March

 March 2 – Tom Wolfe, American author, journalist (d. 2018)
 March 3
 Heiner Geißler, German politician (d. 2017)
 Ion Iliescu, 2-time President of Romania
 K. S. Rajah, Singaporean Senior Counsel, Judicial Commissioner of the Supreme Court (d. 2010)
 March 6
 Allison Hayes, American actress (d. 1977)
 Lorin Maazel, French-born American orchestral conductor (d. 2014)
 March 7 
 Antony Armstrong-Jones, 1st Earl of Snowdon, English photographer, royal spouse (d. 2017)
 Daphne Osborne, English botanist (d. 2006)
 March 8 – Douglas Hurd, English politician 
 March 9 (or 19) – Ornette Coleman, American jazz saxophonist (d. 2015)
 March 13 
 Liz Anderson, American country music singer and songwriter (d. 2011)
 Sue Johanson, Canadian Sex Educator and TV personality
 March 14
 Irma Adelman, Romanian-born economist (d. 2017)
 Helga Feddersen, German actress (d. 1990)
 March 15
 Alba Arnova, Italian-Argentine ballerina, actress (d. 2018)
 Zhores Alferov, Russian physicist, Nobel Prize laureate (d. 2019)
 Shadi Abdel Salam, Egyptian film director, screenwriter and costume and set designer (d. 1986)
 March 17 – James Irwin, American astronaut (d. 1991)
 March 18 – Adam Cardinal Maida, American Roman Catholic prelate; Archbishop of Detroit (1990–2009)
 March 19 – Gualtiero Marchesi, Italian chef and restaurateur (d. 2017)
 March 20 – Thomas Stafford Williams, New Zealand cardinal
 March 22
 Sir Lynden Pindling, 1st prime minister of the Bahamas (d. 2000)
 Pat Robertson, American televangelist, motivational speaker, author and television host
 Stephen Sondheim, American composer and lyricist (d. 2021)
 March 24
 David Dacko, 1st President of the Central African Republic (d. 2003)
 Steve McQueen, American actor (d. 1980)
 March 26 – Sandra Day O'Connor, American politician, Associate Justice of the Supreme Court of the United States
 March 27 – Daniel Spoerri, Romanian-Swiss artist and writer 
 March 28
 Robert Ashley, American composer (d. 2014)
 Jerome Isaac Friedman, American physicist, Nobel Prize laureate
 Albert S. Ruddy, Canadian film and television producer
 March 29
 Anerood Jugnauth, Mauritian politician, 3-time Prime Minister of Mauritius, and 4th President of Mauritius (d. 2021)
 John Marshall, Australian swimmer (d. 1957)
 March 30
 John Astin, American actor
 Rolf Harris, Australian entertainer
 March 31 
 Julián Herranz Casado, Spanish cardinal 
 Susan Weil, American artist

April 

 April 1 – Grace Lee Whitney, American actress (Star Trek) (d. 2015)
 April 3
 Lawton Chiles, American politician, U.S. Senator (Florida), 41st Governor of Florida (d. 1998)
 Helmut Kohl, Chancellor of Germany (d. 2017)
 April 5
 Mary Costa, American opera singer and actress 
 Pierre Lhomme, French cinematographer (d. 2019)
 April 7 
 Vilma Espín, Cuban revolutionary, feminist, and chemical engineer (d. 2007)
 Andrew Sachs, German-born British actor (d. 2016)
 April 8 – Carlos Hugo, Duke of Parma (d. 2010)
 April 9 – F. Albert Cotton, American chemist (d. 2007)
 April 10 
 Claude Bolling, French jazz pianist and composer (d. 2020)
 Dolores Huerta, American labor leader and civil rights activist
 Frank Lary, American baseball player (d. 2017)
 Spede Pasanen, Finnish television personality (d. 2001)
 April 11
 Nicholas F. Brady, American politician and businessman 
 Anton LaVey, American author, musician, and occultist (d. 1997)
 April 12 – John Landy, Australian athlete and politician (d. 2022) 
 April 14 – Bradford Dillman, American actor and author (d. 2018)
 April 15 – Vigdís Finnbogadóttir, President of Iceland
 April 16 – Herbie Mann, American jazz flutist (d. 2003)
 April 19 – Dick Sargent, American actor and gay activist (d. 1994)
 April 21 – Silvana Mangano, Italian actress (d. 1989)
 April 24
 Richard Donner, American film director and producer (d. 2021)
 José Sarney, 31st President of Brazil
 April 25 – Paul Mazursky, American director and writer (d. 2014)
 April 26 – Roger Moens, Belgian athlete and sportscaster
 April 28
 James Baker, former United States Secretary of State
 Carolyn Jones, American actress (d. 1983)
 April 29
 Jean Rochefort, French actor (d. 2017)
 Irv Weinstein, American broadcaster, television news anchor (d. 2017)
 Mahmud of Terengganu, 16th Sultan of Terengganu (d. 1998)
 April 30 – Félix Guattari, French psychotherapist, philosopher, semiologist, and activist (d. 1992)

May

 May 1 
 Ethel Ayler, American actress (d. 2018)
 Probosutedjo, Indonesian businessman (d. 2018)
 Little Walter, African-American blues singer, musician, and songwriter (d. 1968)
 Richard Riordan, The 39th Mayor of Los Angeles from 1993 to 2001.
 May 3 – Juan Gelman, Argentine poet, writer (d. 2014)
 May 4 – Roberta Peters, American soprano (d. 2017)
 May 5 – Michael J. Adams, American aviator, aeronautical engineer, and astronaut (d. 1967)
 May 8 
 Heather Harper, Northern Irish soprano (d. 2019)
 Gary Snyder, American poet, essayist and translator 
 May 9 – Joan Sims, English actress (d. 2001)
 May 11 – Edsger W. Dijkstra, Dutch computer scientist (d. 2002)
 May 13
 Vernon Shaw, 5th president of Dominica (d. 2013)
 Mike Gravel, American politician, former Senator of Alaska and Presidential candidate (d. 2021)
 May 14 – María Irene Fornés, Cuban-American playwright (d. 2018)
 May 15
 Jasper Johns, American painter
 Grace Ogot, Kenyan author, nurse, journalist, politician and diplomat (d. 2015)
 May 17 – María Luisa Mendoza, Mexican journalist, novelist and politician (d. 2018)
 May 19 – Lorraine Hansberry, African-American playwright (d. 1965)
 May 20 – James McEachin, American actor 
 May 21 – Malcolm Fraser, 22nd Prime Minister of Australia (d. 2015)
 May 22
 Kenny Ball, British jazz trumpeter, singer and bandleader (d. 2013)
 Harvey Milk, American politician and gay rights activist (d. 1978)
 May 25 – Sonia Rykiel, French fashion designer (d. 2016)
 May 27  
 John Barth, American writer
 Muhammad Lafir, Sri Lankan snooker player (d. 1981) 
 May 28 – Edward Seaga, Jamaican politician, 5th Prime Minister of Jamaica (d. 2019)
 May 31 
 Ruslan Stratonovich, Russian physicist, engineer (d. 1997)
 Clint Eastwood, American actor, director, and producer

June

 June 1 – Edward Woodward, English actor and singer (d. 2009)
 June 2 – Pete Conrad, American astronaut, moonwalker and commander of Apollo 12 (d. 1999)
 June 3
 Marion Zimmer Bradley, American writer (d. 1999)
 George Fernandes, Indian politician (d. 2019)
 June 4
 Morgana King, American jazz singer, actress (d. 2018)
 Viktor Tikhonov, Soviet ice hockey player and coach (d. 2014)
 June 6 – Frank Tyson, English cricketer (d. 2015)
 June 8 – Robert Aumann, German-born mathematician, recipient of the Nobel Memorial Prize in Economic Sciences
 June 9 
 Barbara, French singer (d. 1997)
 Jordi Pujol, 126th President of the Government of Catalonia
 June 10 – Grace Mirabella, American journalist, editor of Vogue 1971-88 (d. 2021)
 June 11
 Neale Lavis, Australian equestrian (d. 2019)
 Charles Rangel, African-American politician
 June 12 
 Jim Nabors, American actor, musician and comedian (d. 2017)
 Son Sen, Cambodian politician and war criminal (d. 1997)
 June 16 – Vilmos Zsigmond, Hungarian-American cinematographer (d. 2016)
 June 19 – Gena Rowlands, American actress
 June 20 
 Magdalena Abakanowicz, Polish sculptor (d. 2017)
 Juan Alberto Melgar Castro, Honduran military ruler (d. 1987)
 June 21 – Gerald Kaufman, British Labour politician (d. 2017)
 June 22
 Yury Artyukhin, Russian cosmonaut (d. 1998)
 Sa'dun Hammadi, 33rd prime minister of Iraq (d. 2007)
 June 23
 John Elliott, British historian (d. 2022)
 Anthony Thwaite, English poet, critic, and academic (d. 2021)
 June 24
 Claude Chabrol, French film director (d. 2010)
 Herb Klein, American businessman, attorney and politician
 June 26 
 Wolfgang Schwanitz, German Leader of the Office for National Security, Head of the Stasi (d. 2022)
 Moeenuddin Ahmad Qureshi, Pakistani economist and caretaker prime minister (d. 2016)
 June 27 – Ross Perot, American business magnate, billionaire, politician, and philantrophist (d. 2019)
 June 28
 William C. Campbell, Irish-American biologist, parasitologist, Nobel Prize laureate
 Itamar Franco, President of Brazil (d. 2011)
 June 29 
 Robert Evans, American producer (d. 2019)
 Viola Léger, American-Canadian actress and politician 
 June 30
 Ignatius Peter VIII Abdalahad, Syrian bishop (d. 2018)
Thomas Sowell, American economist and social theorist 
 Ahmed Zaki Yamani, Saudi Arabian politician (d. 2021)

July

 July 1 – Gonzalo Sánchez de Lozada, Bolivian politician and businessman
 July 2
 Sylve Bengtsson, Swedish Olympic footballer (d. 2005)
 Ahmad Jamal, American jazz pianist and composer
 Carlos Menem, President of Argentina (d. 2021)
 July 3
 Carlos Kleiber, Austrian conductor (d. 2004)
 Ferdinando Riva, Swiss football forward (d. 2014)
 N. Venkatachala, Indian judge (d. 2019)
 July 4
 George Steinbrenner, American businessman and baseball team owner (d. 2010)
 Yuriy Tyukalov, Russian rower (d. 2018)
 July 6
 George Armstrong, Canadian professional ice hockey player (d. 2021)
 Françoise Mallet-Joris, Belgian writer (d. 2016)
 M. Balamuralikrishna, Indian Carnatic vocalist, multi-instrumentalist, playback singer, composer and actor (d. 2016)
 July 7
 Theodore McCarrick, American Roman Catholic former cardinal
 Biljana Plavšić, Bosnian politician and war criminal
 July 9
Slavko Dacevski, Macedonian football player and manager
 Patricia Newcomb, American producer and publicist
 July 11
 Jack Alabaster, New Zealand cricketer 
 Harold Bloom, American literary critic (d. 2019)
 July 12 – Gordon Pinsent, Canadian actor (d. 2023)
 July 14 – Polly Bergen, American actress (d. 2014)
 July 15
 Einosuke Akiya, Japanese Buddhist leader
 Jacques Derrida, Algerian-born French literary critic (d. 2004)
 Stephen Smale, American mathematician
 July 17
 Sigvard Ericsson, Swedish speed skater (d. 2019)
 Ray Galton, English scriptwriter (d. 2018)
 Sir William Heseltine, Australian Private Secretary to Queen Elizabeth II
 July 19 – David Rubadiri, Malawian diplomat, academic, poet, playwright and novelist (d. 2018)
 July 20
 Alex Sánchez, Costa Rican football player
 Oleg Anofriyev, Soviet-Russian actor, singer, songwriter, film director and poet (d. 2018)
 July 21
 Gene Littler, American professional golfer (d. 2019) 
 Helen Merrill, American jazz vocalist
 Anand Bakshi, Indian poet/lyricist (d. 2002)
 July 24 – Jacqueline Brookes, American actress (d. 2013)
 July 25
 Murray Chapple, New Zealand cricketer (d. 1985)
 Maureen Forrester, Canadian contralto (d. 2010)
 Mitzi Shore, American comedy club owner (d. 2018)
 July 28
 Firoza Begum, Bangladeshi singer (d. 2014)
 Jean Roba, Belgian comics author (d. 2006)

August

 August 1
 Pierre Bourdieu, French sociologist (d. 2002)
 Lawrence Eagleburger, United States Secretary of State (d. 2011)
 Károly Grósz, 51st prime minister of Hungary (d. 1996)
 Geoffrey Holder, Trinidadian-American dancer, choreographer and actor (d. 2014) 
 August 4
 Enrico Castellani, Italian painter (d. 2017) 
 Ali al-Sistani, Iranian Shia Ayatollah
 August 5 – Neil Armstrong, American astronaut, first human to set foot on the Moon, commander of Apollo 11 (d. 2012)
 August 6 – Abbey Lincoln, American singer (d. 2010)
 August 9 
 Carmen Balcells, Spanish literary agent (d. 2015)
 Jacques Parizeau, French-Canadian politician (d. 2015)
 August 10 – Luigi De Filippo, Italian actor (d. 2018)
 August 12 – George Soros, Hungarian-born investor
 August 13 – Don Ho, American singer and entertainer (d. 2007)
 August 14
 Earl Weaver, American professional baseball player and manager (d. 2013)
 Liz Fraser, English actress (d. 2018)
 August 15 – Tom Mboya, Kenyan trade unionist, educationist, Pan Africanist, author and independence activist (probable; d. 1969)
 August 16
 Robert Culp, American actor (d. 2010)
 Leslie Manigat, 34th President of Haiti (d. 2014)
 Flor Silvestre, Mexican singer, actress and equestrienne (d. 2020)
 Tony Trabert, American tennis player and commentator (d. 2021) 
 August 17 – Ted Hughes, English poet (d. 1998)
 August 19 – Frank McCourt, Irish-American writer (d. 2009)
 August 20 – Jan Olszewski, 3rd Prime Minister of Poland (d. 2019)
 August 21 – Princess Margaret, Countess of Snowdon (d. 2002)
 August 22 – Gylmar dos Santos Neves, Brazilian footballer (d. 2013)
 August 23 – Michel Rocard, Prime Minister of France (d. 2016)
 August 24 – Sultanah Bahiyah, Sultanah of Kedah (d. 2003)
 August 25
 Sir Sean Connery, Scottish actor (James Bond) (d. 2020) 
 Georgiy Daneliya, Russian film director and screenwriter (d. 2019)
 August 27 – Gholamreza Takhti, Iranian wrestler (d. 1968)
 August 28 
 Windsor Davies, Welsh actor (d. 2019)
 Ben Gazzara, American actor (d. 2012)
Irinej, Serbian Patriarch, 45th Patriarch of the Serbian Orthodox Church (d. 2020)
 August 30
 Warren Buffett, American billionaire entrepreneur
 Xernona Clayton, American civil rights activist and broadcasting executive 
 Paul Poupard, French cardinal

September

 September 1 – Charles Correa, Indian architect (d. 2015)
 September 3 – Cherry Wilder, New Zealand novelist (d. 2002)
 September 4 – Norman Dorsen, American civil rights activist (d. 2017)
 September 6 – Salvatore De Giorgi, Italian cardinal 
 September 7
 King Baudouin I of Belgium (d. 1993)
 Sonny Rollins, African-American jazz saxophonist
 September 8 
 Mario Adorf, German actor
 Jeannette Altwegg, English figure skater (d. 2021)
 September 9 – Frank Lucas, African-American drug trafficker (d. 2019)
 September 11 – Renzo Montagnani, Italian actor (d. 1997)
 September 12 – Akira Suzuki, Japanese chemist, Nobel Prize laureate
 September 13
 Bola Ige, Nigerian politician (d. 2001)
 Jimmy McLane, American Olympic swimmer (d. 2020) 
 September 16 – Anne Francis, American actress (d. 2011)
 September 17
 Marie-Thérèse Houphouët-Boigny, First Lady of Ivory Coast
 David Huddleston, American actor (The Big Lebowski) (d. 2016)
 Edgar Mitchell, American astronaut (d. 2016)
 Thomas P. Stafford, American astronaut
 September 20 – Kenneth Mopeli, Chief Minister of QwaQwa bantustan (d. 2014)
 September 23 – Ray Charles, African-American singer, musician and actor (d. 2004)
 September 24 – John Young, American astronaut (d. 2018)
 September 25 
 Elsa Aguirre, Mexican actress
 Shel Silverstein, American author, poet and humorist (d. 1999)
 September 26
 Philip Bosco, American actor (d. 2018)
 Fritz Wunderlich, German tenor singer (d. 1966)
 September 29
 Colin Dexter, English detective fiction writer (d. 2017)
 Richard Bonynge, Australian pianist and conductor

October

 October 1
 Richard Harris, Irish actor, singer (d. 2002)
 Philippe Noiret, French actor (d. 2006)
 October 2 – Dave Barrett, Canadian politician (d. 2018)
 October 4 – Andrej Marinc, Slovenian politician 
 October 5
 Pavel Popovich, Soviet cosmonaut (d. 2009)
 Reinhard Selten, German economist, Nobel Prize laureate (d. 2016)
 October 6
 Hafez al-Assad, President of Syria (d. 2000)
 Richie Benaud, Australian cricketer and commentator (d. 2015)
 October 8 – Tōru Takemitsu, Japanese composer (d. 1996)
 October 10
 Yves Chauvin, Belgian-born chemist, Nobel Prize laureate (d. 2015)
 Harold Pinter, English playwright, Nobel Prize laureate (d. 2008)
 October 14
 Schafik Handal, Salvadoran politician (d. 2006)
 Mobutu Sese Seko, President of Democratic Republic of the Congo (d. 1997) 
 October 17 – Robert Atkins, American nutritionist (d. 2003)
 October 18 – Frank Carlucci, American politician (d. 2018)
 October 19 – Ron Joyce, Canadian businessman (d. 2019)
 October 21 – Ivan Silayev, Soviet and Russian politician (d. 2023)
 October 24 
 Ahmad Shah of Pahang, Yang di-Pertuan Agong of Malaysia (d. 2019)
 The Big Bopper (J.P. Richardson), American singer (d. 1959)
 October 27 – Francisca Aguirre, Spanish poet (d. 2019)
 October 28 – Bernie Ecclestone, English motor racing tycoon
 October 29
 Omara Portuondo, Cuban singer and dancer
 Niki de Saint Phalle, French artist (d. 2002)
 October 30
 Clifford Brown, American jazz trumpeter (d. 1956)
 Timothy Findley, Canadian author (d. 2002)
 October 31 – Michael Collins, American astronaut (d. 2021)

November

 November 5 – Hans Mommsen, German historian (d. 2015)
 November 6 – Derrick Bell, American law professor (d. 2011)
 November 11
 Mildred Dresselhaus, American scientist and educator (d. 2017)
 Mabandla Dlamini, 3rd prime minister of Swaziland
 Alevtina Kolchina, Soviet Olympic cross-country skier (d. 2022)
 November 13 – Richard A. Falk, American academic
 November 14
 Monique Mercure, Canadian actress (d. 2020)
 Jānis Pujats, Latvian cardinal, Archbishop of Riga 
 Ed White, American astronaut (d. 1967)
 November 15 – J. G. Ballard, English writer (d. 2009)
 November 16
 Chinua Achebe, Nigerian writer (d. 2013)
 Salvatore Riina ("Toto"), Italian multiple murderer (d. 2017)
November 17 – Bob Mathias, American athlete (d. 2006)
 November 19 – Christian Schwarz-Schilling, Austrian-German politician and philanthropist  
 November 20 – Choe Yong-rim, North Korean politician 
 November 22 – Owen Garriott, American astronaut (d. 2019)
 November 24 – Inge Feltrinelli, German-Italian publisher, photographer (d. 2018)
 November 26 – Berthold Leibinger, German engineer, entrepreneur and philanthropist (d. 2018)
 November 29 – David Goldblatt, South African photographer (d. 2018)
 November 30 – G. Gordon Liddy, American organizer of the Watergate burglaries (d. 2021)

December

 December 2 – Gary Becker, American economist, Nobel Prize laureate (d. 2014)
 December 3 – Jean-Luc Godard, French film director (d. 2022)
 December 4
 Ronnie Corbett, Scottish comedian (d. 2016)
 Jacqueline du Bief, French figure skater
 December 6 – Daniel Lisulo, Prime Minister of Zambia (d. 2000)
 December 7 – Christopher Nicole, Guyanese-born British writer
 December 8 – Maximilian Schell, Swiss-Austrian actor (d. 2014)
 December 9 
 Edoardo Sanguineti, Italian writer (d. 2010)
 Buck Henry, American actor, screenwriter, and director (d. 2020)
 December 11 – Jean-Louis Trintignant, French actor and director (d. 2022)
 December 12 – Silvio Santos, Brazilian TV show host, entrepreneur
 December 15
 Antonietta Meo, Italian saint (d. 1937)
 Edna O'Brien, Irish writer
 December 17 – Armin Mueller-Stahl, Russian-born German actor
December 19 – Anca Giurchescu, Romanian academic and ethnochoreologist (d. 2015)
 December 21
 Adebayo Adedeji, Nigerian UN official (d. 2018)
 Kalevi Sorsa, Prime Minister of Finland (d. 2004)
 December 25 – Salah Jahin, Egyptian poet, lyricist, playwright and cartoonist (d. 1986)
 December 28 – Mariam A. Aleem, Egyptian artist (d. 2010)
 December 30 
 Alvin Peterson, Jamaican percussionist (d. 2021)
 Tu Youyou, Chinese pharmaceutical chemist, Nobel Prize laureate
 December 31 – Odetta, American singer (d. 2008)

Deaths

January – June

 January 8 – Martha Tynæs, Norwegian social worker and politician (b. 1870)
 January 9 – Edward Bok, American author (b. 1863)
 January 13 – John Nathan Cobb, American author, naturalist, conservationist, fisheries researcher, and educator (b. 1868)
 January 19 – Frank Ramsey, British philosopher, mathematician and economist (b. 1903)
 January 22 – Reginald Brett, 2nd Viscount Esher, British politician and courtier (b. 1852)
 January 24 – Rebecca Latimer Felton, American writer, lecturer, reformer, and politician (b. 1835)
 January 27 – Dewa Shigetō, Japanese admiral (b. 1856)
 January 28 – Emmy Destinn, Czech operatic soprano (b. 1878)
 February 3 
 Michele Bianchi, Italian fascist leader (b. 1883)
 Poseidon, Australian racehorse (b. 1903)
 February 14 – Sir Thomas MacKenzie, New Zealand politician, explorer, 18th Prime Minister of New Zealand and High Commissioner (b. 1854)
 February 15 – Giulio Douhet, Italian general, air power theorist (b. 1869)
 February 21 – Ahmad Shah Qajar, Shah of Persia (b. 1898)
 February 23
 Mabel Normand, American actress (b. 1892)
 Horst Wessel, Nazi ideologue, composer (b. 1907)
 February 26
Mary Whiton Calkins, American philosopher and psychologist (b. 1863)
Rafael Merry del Val, British-born Spanish Roman Catholic cardinal and Servant of God (b. 1865)
 February 28 – Sir Perceval Maitland Laurence, British classical scholar, South African judge and a benefactor of the University of Cambridge (b. 1854)
 March 2 – D. H. Lawrence, British writer (Lady Chatterley's Lover) (b. 1885)
 March 6 – Alfred von Tirpitz, German politician, admiral (b. 1848)
 March 8 – William Howard Taft, 27th President of the United States, 10th Chief Justice of the United States (b. 1857)
 March 12 – William George Barker, Canadian pilot (b. 1894)
 March 13 – Mary Eleanor Wilkins Freeman, American author (b. 1852)
 March 16 – Miguel Primo de Rivera, Spanish military officer, Prime Minister of Spain (b. 1870)
 March 19 – Arthur Balfour, British politician and statesman, 48th Prime Minister of the United Kingdom (b. 1848)
 March 24 – Eugeen Van Mieghem, Belgian painter (b. 1875)
 March 27 – Sister Christine, German-born Hindu teacher
 March 30 – Shyamji Krishna Varma, Indian lawyer, journalist and revolutionary (b. 1857)
 April 1 – Cosima Wagner, wife and inspiration of Richard Wagner (b. 1837)
 April 2 – Empress Zewditu of Ethiopia (b. 1876)
 April 3 – Dame Emma Albani, Canadian operatic soprano (b. 1847)
 April 4 – Victoria of Baden, Queen consort of Sweden (b. 1862)
 April 6 – Dimitrije, Serbian Patriarch (b. 1846)
 April 9 – Rose Caron, French operatic soprano (b. 1857)
 April 14 – Vladimir Mayakovsky, Russian poet (b. 1893)
 April 16 – Linda Richards, American nurse (b. 1841)
 April 21 – Robert Bridges, British poet (b. 1844)
 April 22 – Jeppe Aakjær, Danish poet, novelist (b. 1866)
 May 8 – Patriarch George V of Armenia (b. 1847) 
 May 13 – Fridtjof Nansen, Norwegian explorer, recipient of the Nobel Peace Prize (b. 1861)
 May 17 – Herbert Croly, American political author (b. 1869)
 May 25
 Randall Davidson, English clergyman, Archbishop of Canterbury (b. 1848)
 Archduke Rainer of Austria (b. 1895)
 June 5
 Sophie Holten, Danish painter (b. 1858)
 Eric Lemming, Swedish athlete (b. 1880)
 Jules Pascin, Bulgarian painter (b. 1885)
 June 10 – Adolf von Harnack, German Lutheran theologian and church historian (b. 1851)
 June 13 – Sir Henry Segrave, British racer, land and water speed record holder (b. 1896)
 June 16 – Anna Whitlock, Swedish suffragist (b. 1852)

July– December

 July 7 – Sir Arthur Conan Doyle, British fiction writer (Sherlock Holmes) (b. 1859)
 July 8 – Sir Joseph Ward, 17th Prime Minister of New Zealand (b. 1856)
 July 11 – Masataka Ogawa, Japanese chemist (b. 1865)
 July 15
 Leopold Auer, Hungarian violinist (b. 1845)
 Rudolph Schildkraut, Ottoman-born Austrian actor (b. 1862)
 July 16 – Juan Luis Sanfuentes, 16th President of Chile (b. 1858)
 July 19
 Sir Robert Stout, 2-time prime minister of New Zealand (b. 1844)
 Oku Yasukata, Japanese field marshal, leading figure in the early Imperial Japanese Army (b. 1847)
 July 23 – Glenn Curtiss, American aviation pioneer (b. 1878)
 July 26 – Pavlos Karolidis, Greek historian (b. 1849)
 July 28 – Allvar Gullstrand, Swedish ophthalmologist, recipient of the Nobel Prize in Physiology or Medicine (b. 1862)
 August 4 – Siegfried Wagner, German composer and conductor, son of Richard Wagner (born 1869)
 August 11 – Edward Angle, American dentist (b. 1855)
 August 12 – Sir Horace Smith-Dorrien, English general (b. 1858)
 August 15 – Florian Cajori, Swiss-born historian of mathematics (b. 1859)
 August 21 – Sir Aston Webb, British architect (b. 1849)
 August 24 – Tom Norman, British freak showman (b. 1860)
 August 26 – Lon Chaney, American actor (b. 1883)
 August 29 – William Archibald Spooner, British scholar, Anglican priest (b. 1844)
 September 1 – Peeter Põld, Estonian pedagogical scientist, politician (b. 1878)
 September 10 – Aubrey Faulkner, South African cricketer (b. 1881)
 September 18 – Ruth Alexander, pioneering American pilot (b. 1905)
 September 20 – Gombojab Tsybikov, Russian explorer (b. 1873)
 September 28
 Daniel Guggenheim, American mining magnate and philanthropist (b. 1856)
 Prince Leopold of Bavaria, German prince and field marshal (b. 1846)
 September 30 – Albert W. Grant, American admiral (b. 1856)
 October 2 – Gordon Stewart Northcott, American serial killer (executed) (b. 1906)
 October 4 – Olena Pchilka, Ukrainian writer, translator and publisher (b. 1849)
 October 10 – Adolf Engler, German botanist (b. 1844)
 October 15 – Herbert Henry Dow, Canadian-born chemical industrialist (b. 1866)
 October 16 – James Surtees Phillpotts, English writer and educator (b. 1839)
 October 20 – Valeriano Weyler, 1st Duke of Rubí, Spanish general (b. 1838) 
 October 26 – Harry Payne Whitney, American horse breeder and businessman (b. 1872)
 October 27 – Ellen Hayes, American mathematician and astronomer (b. 1851)
 October 28 – Mary Harrison McKee, de facto First Lady of the United States (b. 1858)
 October 30 – Sakichi Toyoda, Japanese inventor, industrialist (b. 1867)
 November – Alfred Wegener, German geophysicist, meteorologist (b. 1880)
 November 3 – Nikolai Alexandrov, Soviet actor and director (b. 1870)
 November 4 – Akiyama Yoshifuru, Japanese general (b. 1859)
 November 5
 Christiaan Eijkman, Dutch physician, pathologist, and recipient of the Nobel Prize in Physiology or Medicine (b. 1858)
 Luigi Facta, Italian politician, 26th Prime Minister of Italy (b. 1861)
 November 8 – Alexander Bedward, Jamaican preacher (b. 1848)
 November 9 – Tasker H. Bliss, American general (b. 1853)
 November 20 – Sir Neville Howse, Australian politician and recipient of the Victoria Cross (b. 1863)
 November 21 – Clelia Merloni, Italian nun and founder of the Apostles of the Sacred Heart of Jesus
 November 26 – Sir Ponnambalam Ramanathan, Sinhalese lawyer and politician (b. 1851)
 November 27
 Johnny Tyldesley, English cricketer (b. 1873)
 Simon Kahquados, Potawatomi political activist (b. 1851)
 November 28 – Constantine VI, Turkish-born bishop, briefly Ecumenical Patriarch of Constantinople (b. 1859)
 November 30 – Mary Harris Jones, Irish-born American labor leader (b. 1837)
 December 8 – Florbela Espanca, Portuguese poet (b. 1894)
 December 9
 Andrew "Rube" Foster, American Negro league baseball player (b. 1879)
 Laura Muntz Lyall, Canadian painter (b. 1860)
 December 12 – Nikolai Pokrovsky, Russian politician, last foreign minister of the Russian Empire (b. 1865)
 December 13 – Fritz Pregl, Austrian chemist, Nobel Prize laureate (b. 1869)
 December 17 – Peter Warlock, British composer (b. 1894)
 December 22 – Vintilă Brătianu, 31st Prime Minister of Romania (b. 1867)
 December 25 – Eugen Goldstein, German physicist (b. 1850)

Nobel Prizes

 Physics – Sir Chandrasekhara Venkata Raman
 Chemistry – Hans Fischer
 Physiology or Medicine – Karl Landsteiner
 Literature – Sinclair Lewis
 Peace – Nathan Söderblom

References

Sources
 The 1930s Timeline: 1930 – from American Studies Programs at The University of Virginia